Torside Reservoir is the largest man-made lake in Longdendale in north Derbyshire. It was constructed by John Frederick Bateman between April 1849 and July 1864 as part of the Longdendale chain to supply water from the River Etherow to the urban areas of Greater Manchester.

The Manchester Corporation Waterworks Act 1847 gave permission for the construction of the Woodhead and Arnfield reservoirs; the Manchester Corporation Waterworks Act 1848 allowed the construction of Torside and Rhodeswood Reservoir, and an aqueduct to convey the water to the Arnfield reservoir where it would pass through the Mottram Tunnel to Godley.

It was stated in a statutory report, under the Reservoir Safety Act 1975, dated 12 June, that all five reservoirs could be overtopped during a Probable Maximum Flood. Woodhead, as the fountainhead, would require the most extensive improvements, but Torside needed crest remedial work. The work took place between 1993 and 1994.

See also 
List of dams and reservoirs in United Kingdom

References

External links

Reservoirs of the Peak District
Drinking water reservoirs in England
Works by John Frederick Bateman
Reservoirs in Derbyshire